Klaus Jacob (born 20 April 1943) is a German rower who competed for East Germany in the 1968 Summer Olympics.

He was born in Aussig in 1943; this became part of Czechoslovakia after WWII. In 1968 he was a crew member of the East German boat which won the silver medal in the coxed four event.

References

External links
 

1943 births
Living people
Sportspeople from Ústí nad Labem
People from Sudetenland
Sudeten German people
East German male rowers
Olympic rowers of East Germany
Rowers at the 1968 Summer Olympics
Olympic silver medalists for East Germany
Olympic medalists in rowing
Medalists at the 1968 Summer Olympics
Recipients of the Patriotic Order of Merit in bronze